Gongzhufen is a major traffic and public transportation hub in the Haidian District of  western Beijing, China. The name literally means "Tomb of the Princess". 

Gongzhufen lies at the intersection of the 3rd Ring Road and Fuxing Road. Prior to the mid-1990s, there was a traffic circle at the intersection. Today, traffic is handled by a three-level cloverleaf interchange. 

The area has several shopping centers, a bus terminal from which buses 32, 33, 64, 94, 370, 437, and 451 start, and the Gongzhufen Subway Station, which is served by Lines 1 and 10 of the Beijing Subway. Nearby landmarks include the CCTV Tower to the north, the China Military Museum to the east, and the Beijing West railway station in the southeast.

External links
Satellite photo of the interchange at Gongzhufen

Road transport in Beijing
Haidian District
Neighbourhoods of Beijing